Frederiksborg Latin School (Danish: Frederiksborg Latinskole) is a former latin school in Hillerød, Denmark. The school changed its name to Frederiksborg State School (Danish: Frederiksborg Statsskole) in 1903. The school moved to new premises in 1958 and is now called Frederiksborg Gymnasium. Its old building at Søndre Jernbanevej 4A was built to a Neoclassical design by Jørgen Hansen Koch in 1836. It was listed on the Danish registry of protected buildings and places in 1945.

History

The first building
 
The first latin school in Hillerød opened in 1566 but it closed again in 1586. A new school was established in connection with the completion of Frederiksborg Castle on 29 March 1630 but the school building was not completed until 1633. It was called Frederiksborg Lærde Skole.

The current building
The school was destroyed in a fire in 1834 but a new building was inaugurated in 1836. The new building was built to design by Jørgen Hansen Koch.

The school changed its name to Frederiksborg Statsskole in 1903. It was also opened to female students and boys from the working class.

After the move
The building in Søndre Jernbanegade was decommissioned when the school moved to new premises in 1858. The owner of the old building went bankrupt in May 2015. It was sold to a new owner in 2017.

Today
Today, the building is rented out to tenants.

Further reading
 Dahl, F.P.J.: Historiske Efterretninger om den Kongelige lærde Skole ved Frederiksborg, 1836

References

External links
 Renderings in the Danish National Art Library

 Source
 Source
 Source

Listed buildings and structures in Hillerød Municipality
1566 establishments in Denmark
1836 establishments in Denmark
School buildings completed in 1836
Neoclassical architecture in Denmark
Jørgen Hansen Koch buildings
Hillerød